Štětkovice is a municipality and village in Příbram District in the Central Bohemian Region of the Czech Republic. It has about 300 inhabitants.

Administrative parts
Villages of Bořená Hora, Chrastava, Sedlečko are administrative parts of Štětkovice.

Gallery

References

Villages in Příbram District